Influence Vol. 1: The Man I Am is the twentieth studio album and the first covers album by country music star Randy Travis, and was released on October 1, 2013 by Warner Bros. Records Nashville.

Track listing
 "Someday We'll Look Back" (Merle Haggard) - 3:26
 "Big Butter and Egg Man" (Percy Venable) - 3:23
 "What Have You Got Planned Tonight Diana" (Dave Kirby) - 3:28
 "Ever Changing Woman" (Kirby, Curly Putman) - 2:55
 "Pennies from Heaven" (Johnny Burke, Arthur Johnston) - 3:46
 "Thanks a Lot" (Eddie Miller, Don Sessions) - 2:42
 "Trouble in Mind" (Richard M. Jones) - 3:29
 "My Mary" (Jimmie Davis, Stuart Hamblen) - 3:09
 "Saginaw, Michigan" (Bill Anderson, Don Wayne) - 3:10
 "I'm Always on a Mountain (When I Fall)" (Chuck Howard) - 3:21
 "You Asked Me To" (Waylon Jennings, Billy Joe Shaver) - 3:40
 "Why Baby Why" (Darrell Edwards, George Jones) - 2:40
 "Tonight I'm Playin' Possum" (with Joe Nichols) (Keith Gattis, Travis) - 3:42

Personnel

 Bill Cook - bass guitar, upright bass, background vocals
 Lance Dary - acoustic guitar, background vocals
 David Davidson - violin
 Joe Van Dyke - keyboards
 Connie Ellisor - violin
 Steve Gibson - electric guitar, gut string guitar, mandolin
 Jim Grosjean - viola
 Wes Hightower - background vocals
 Steve Hinson - dobro, steel guitar
 Robb Houstan - acoustic guitar, background vocals
 Jon Mark Ivey - background vocals
 David Johnson - fiddle
 Kyle Lehning - Wurlitzer
 Joe Manuel - acoustic guitar
 Rick Wayne Money - electric guitar, tic tac bass guitar
 Joe Nichols - duet vocals on "Tonight I'm Playing Possom"
 Carole Rabinowitz - cello
 Herb Shucher - drums
 Lisa Silver - background vocals
 Pam Sixfin - violin 
 Kira Small - background vocals
 Randy Travis - lead vocals
 Alan Umstead - violin
 Bergen White - background vocals
 Kris Wilkinson - viola

Chart performance

References

2013 albums
Randy Travis albums
Warner Records albums
Albums produced by Kyle Lehning
Covers albums